Eupithecia devestita is a moth in the  family Geometridae. It is found in Cameroon, Ethiopia, Kenya, South Africa, Tanzania and Uganda.

References

Moths described in 1899
devestita
Moths of Africa